First Take is the debut album by the American soul singer Roberta Flack. It was released on June 20, 1969, by Atlantic Records. After a track from this album, "The First Time Ever I Saw Your Face", was included by Clint Eastwood in his 1971 film Play Misty for Me with the song becoming a number 1 hit in the United States, the album reached number 1 on the Billboard album chart and Billboard R&B album chart. In the 2020 edition of Rolling Stones 500 Greatest Albums of All Time list, the album was ranked number 451.

In 2019, Flack's website announced that First Take would be remastered and re-released as a limited deluxe edition of only 3,000 copies commemorating the album's fiftieth anniversary. The set includes one vinyl LP and two compact discs: one CD is the remastered album and the other contains "rare and unreleased recordings". The set was released on July 24, 2020.

Track listing

Personnel
Roberta Flack – piano, vocals
Bucky Pizzarelli – guitars
Ron Carter – bass
Ray Lucas – drums, percussion
Seldon Powell, Frank Wess – saxophone
Charles McCracken, George Ricci – cello
Benny Powell – trombone
Jimmy Nottingham, Joe Newman – trumpet
Emanuel Green, Gene Orloff – violin
Alfred Brown, Selwart Clarke, Theodore Israel – viola
William S. Fischer – horn & string arrangements, string conducting
Technical
William Arlt – recording engineer
Bob Liftin – remixing engineer
Stanislaw Zagorski – design
Ken Heinen – photography

Chart positions

Certifications

See also
Roberta Flack discography
List of number-one albums of 1972 (U.S.)
List of number-one R&B albums of 1972 (U.S.)

References

External links
"First Take" at discogs

Roberta Flack albums
1969 debut albums
Albums produced by Joel Dorn
Atlantic Records albums